Raymond Sung Joon Cho (born November 18, 1936) is a Canadian politician who has served as the Ontario minister of seniors and accessibility since June 29, 2018. A member of the Progressive Conservative (PC) Party, Cho has sat as a member of Provincial Parliament (MPP) since 2016. He currently represents Scarborough North, and is the Legislative Assembly's oldest sitting MPP. Cho's over 30-year long political career began in 1991 when he was first elected to the Metro Toronto Council. Following amalgamation in 1998, Cho ran for Toronto City Council, where he re-elected eight times until resigning in 2016 following a successful run for Scarborough—Rouge River in a provincial by-election. Prior to entering politics, Cho worked as a social worker.

Early life and education 
Cho immigrated to Canada from South Korea in 1967. He worked as a janitor, waiter and miner, before attending the University of Toronto. Already holding an undergraduate degree from Korea, he completed a Master of Social Work, Master of Education, and a Doctorate of Counseling Psychology. Cho then worker as a social worker for the Catholic Children's Aid Society, the Toronto Board of Education, and the Scarborough Board of Education.

Personal life 
Cho is married to Soon Ok, and has three adult sons: Raymond Jr., Ronald, and William.

In 2018, while campaigning in Scarborough, Cho suffered a stroke. He was taken to Sunnybrook Health Sciences Centre and treated in intensive care. Cho continued to suffer balance issues after his stay in hospital.

Political career
Cho was a New Democratic Party (NDP) candidate in Scarborough—Rouge River for election to the House of Commons in the 1988 federal election. He was initially identified as a New Democrat when he joined Metro Council, however, he soon became an ally and supporter of then-Metropolitan Toronto Chairman Alan Tonks and dropped his NDP affiliation. He subsequently took out membership in the Liberal Party though, like most non-NDP municipal politicians in Ontario he did not run on a party label in municipal elections.

He was first elected to Metropolitan Toronto Council for Scarborough-Malvern in 1991, and was re-elected in 1994.  After the Scarborough and the other suburbs were amalgamated into the new City of Toronto,  Cho was elected to the new council representing Scarborough-Malvern in 1997 along with Bas Balkissoon. In 2000, he was again re-elected, representing the new ward of Scarborough Rouge-River. He won re-election in 2003, 2006 and 2010. Cho was Chairman of the Toronto Zoo for two successive terms.

He ran in the 2004 federal election as an independent candidate in Scarborough—Rouge River.  Cho called himself an "independent Liberal", and used the Liberal Party of Canada's red-and-white colours for his campaign materials.  He was accused of trying to mislead voters by the official Liberal candidate, Derek Lee. Lee, who has been the MP since 1988 said that Cho caused some controversy by claiming to have been shut out of the candidate nomination process. Lee won the election, Cho placed a distant second with 6,692 votes (17.8% of the total).

On August 13, 2004, the Toronto Star reported that Cho spent nearly all of his allotted councillor expense fund, one of the highest on city council. While there was some speculation that some of this money was diverted to Cho's failed bid to run in the federal election campaign, his executive assistant said the money was needed for newsletters mailed out to constituents to provide information on a rash of fatal shootings in the Malvern neighbourhood earlier in the year.

In 2005, Cho expressed interest in being the Ontario Liberal Party's candidate in the Scarborough—Rouge River provincial by-election which was made necessary by the appointment of incumbent Liberal MPP Alvin Curling to a diplomatic position. However, the Liberal riding association used a clause of its constitution to declare another city councillor, Bas Balkissoon, as its candidate without a contested nomination process. Media reports suggested that this was done to exclude Cho as the provincial riding association was displeased with Cho's "independent Liberal" candidacy in the 2004 federal election. Cho was also mentioned as a potential candidate for the Progressive Conservatives since he helped former leader John Tory during the March 2005 by-election in Dufferin—Peel—Wellington—Grey. In the end, Cho chose not to run in the by-election which was won handily by Balkissoon.

In 2012, Cho was named as the Progressive Conservative candidate for the provincial riding of Scarborough—Rouge River. In the 2014 provincial election, Cho placed third with 27.68% of the vote.

In 2016, Cho was nominated as the Progressive Conservative Party candidate for the September 1 by-election in Scarborough—Rouge River, after incumbent Liberal MPP Bas Balkissoon resigned to spend more time with family. Cho won the by-election in an upset victory, becoming the first Korean-Canadian elected to the Ontario Legislature. Cho was handily re-elected in 2018 in the new riding of Scarborough North, winning over half of the popular vote. Doug Ford, then a former city councillor, served as his campaign chair.

Election results

Federal

Scarborough—Rouge River

Note: Conservative vote is compared to the total of the Canadian Alliance vote and Progressive Conservative vote in 2000 election.

Provincial

Scarborough North

Scarborough—Rouge River

Municipal

Ward 42 (Scarborough—Rouge River)

(x) - incumbent

Cabinet positions

References

External links

 

1936 births
Canadian social workers
Canadian politicians of Korean descent
Independent candidates in the 2004 Canadian federal election
Living people
Members of the Executive Council of Ontario
Metropolitan Toronto councillors
New Democratic Party candidates for the Canadian House of Commons
South Korean emigrants to Canada
Toronto city councillors
University of Toronto alumni
Progressive Conservative Party of Ontario MPPs